Aldo Montano may refer to:

 Aldo Montano (fencer born 1910), Italian fencer
 Aldo Montano (fencer born 1978), Italian fencer and grandson of the above fencer
 Mario Aldo Montano, Italian fencer and son of the fencer born in 1910